Matheson Island Airport  was located on Matheson Island in Lake Winnipeg, Manitoba, Canada.

References

Defunct airports in Manitoba